Live & Well is a live and studio album by B. B. King, released in 1969. The side A contains five tracks recorded "live" at the Village Gate, in New York City, and the side B five titles recorded in 'The Hit Factory' also in New York.

Recording
The album was produced by Bill Szymczyk. The 'live' side was recorded in early March, 1969, by engineer Phil Ramone. Szymczyck wrote in the liner notes: "Some of the songs you've heard before, but the performances of these songs you haven't heard until now".

The 'well' side was recorded in January, 1969, by engineer Joe Zagarino. It contains an instrumental, 'Friends'. Szymczyk wrote: "We got together, what I consider to be, some of the best young blues musicians in the country and locked ourselves in 'The Hit Factory' for two nights. The results of those two nights are the 'well' side of this album."

Track listing
All tracks by B.B. King, except where noted.
Side A - "Live"
"Don't Answer the Door" (J. Johnson) - 6:14
"Just a Little Love" - 5:18
"My Mood" (B.B. King, V.S. Freeman) - 2:39
"Sweet Little Angel" (B.B. King, Jules Taub) - 5:03
"Please Accept My Love" (B.B. King, Sam Ling) - 3:14
Side B - "Well"
"I Want You So Bad" - 4:15
"Friends" (B.B. King, Bill Szymczyk) - 5:37
"Get Off My Back, Woman" (B.B. King, Ferdinand Washington) - 3:16
"Let's Get Down to Business" - 3:36
"Why I Sing the Blues" (B.B. King, Dave Clark) - 8:36

Personnel
"Live" session
B.B. King – guitar, vocals
Sonny Freeman – drums
Lee Gatling – saxophone
Val Patillo – bass guitar
Patrick Williams – trumpet
Charlie Boles – organ

"Well" session
B.B. King – guitar, vocals
Paul "Harry" Harris – piano
Hugh McCracken – guitar
Gerald Jemmott – bass guitar
Herb Lovelle – drums
Al Kooper – piano [only on tracks 6 & 8]

References

B.B. King live albums
1969 live albums
Albums produced by Bill Szymczyk
BluesWay Records live albums